Dark Fire(s) may refer to:

Literature
 Dark Fire (Feehan novel), a novel by Christine Feehan
 Dark Fire (Sansom novel), a novel by C. J. Sansom
 Dark Fire (The Last Dragon Chronicles), a novel by Chris D'Lacey
 Dark Fire, a novel by Ann Maxwell
 Dark Fire, a novel by Peggy Webb
 Dark Fire, a novel by Robyn Donald
 Dark Fires, a novel by Brenda Joyce
 Dark Fires, a novel by Rosemary Rogers

Other uses
 Gibson Dark Fire, a Robot Guitar made by Gibson